All Nothing is a Canadian animated short film, directed by Frédéric Back and released in 1978.

Summary
A portrait of human greed and avarice, the film depicts the impacts of people's drive toward acquisition and consumption on the natural environment.

Release
The film was originally produced for Télévision de Radio-Canada, who broadcast it in 1978, before being released theatrically in other markets in 1980.

Accolades
The film received an Academy Award nomination for Best Animated Short Film at the 53rd Academy Awards.

See also
1978 in film
1980 in film
Crac-the 1981 animated short that secured Back his first Oscar win

References

External links
 

1978 films
1978 animated films
Canadian animated short films
1978 short films
Cultural depictions of Adam and Eve
Environmental films
Films directed by Frédéric Back
1970s Canadian films